Tirania purpurea, the sole species in genus Tirania, is a species of climbing plant native to Asia. This genus is related to Forchhammeria and Stixis, but the placement of these three is uncertain. They were placed in Capparaceae until DNA studies showed them to be more closely related to Resedaceae that to Capparaceae. They are sometimes placed in their own family Stixaceae, but since it is not yet clear whether they are from a clade, they are better left in Brassicales unplaced at family rank.

References

Flora of Asia
Monotypic Brassicales genera
Resedaceae